Alexia 't Serstevens (born 9 November 1999) is a field hockey player from Belgium, who plays as a forward.

Career

Club hockey
In the Belgian Hockey League, 'T Serstevens plays club hockey for the Waterloo Ducks.

National teams

Under–18
In 2016, Alexia 't Serstevens made her debut for the Belgium U–18 team at the EuroHockey Youth Championship in Cork.

Red Panthers
'T Serstevens made her debut for the Belgium 'Red Panthers' in 2018 during a test series against Chile in Brussels.

During the inaugural tournament of the FIH Pro League in 2019, 't Serstevens was a member of the Belgian side that finished in fifth place.

References

External links
 
 

1999 births
Living people
Female field hockey forwards
Belgian female field hockey players
Waterloo Ducks H.C. players